Pseudopsocus meridionalis is a species of Psocoptera from Elipsocidae family that can be found in Cyprus, France, Germany, Italy, Poland, Spain, and Switzerland.

References 

Elipsocidae
Insects described in 1936
Psocoptera of Europe